The International Commission against Impunity in Guatemala (CICIG) was an international body charged with investigating and prosecuting serious crime in Guatemala. On January 7, 2019, the agreement between the United Nations and Guatemala was terminated by Guatemalan president Jimmy Morales, evoking CICIG's alleged participation in illegal acts, abuse of authority and acts against the constitution. The UN rejected this unilateral termination, and the country's highest law court ruled against the president's decision CICIG's term was scheduled to end in September 2019. Morales' decision, approved by the country's business elite, triggered an institutional crisis in Guatemala, as the Constitutional court sided with CICIG. Morales is being investigated concerning his campaign financing.

The CIGIG helped Guatemalan law enforcement dismantle over 70 criminal structures between 2008 and 2019. According to a 2022 study, this may have prevented between 20,000–30,000 homicides over that period.

History
It was created on December 12, 2006, when the United Nations and Guatemala signed a treaty-level agreement setting up CICIG as an independent body to support the Public Prosecutor's Office (Procuraduría General de la Nación), the National Civilian Police (Policía Nacional Civil) and other state institutions in the investigation of sensitive and difficult cases. The ultimate goal of CICIG's work is to strengthen national judicial institutions, to allow them to continue to confront illegal groups and organized crime in the future. The Commissioner in charge is Iván Velásquez Goméz.

On March 24, 2009, Guatemala's Minister of Foreign Relations, Haroldo Rodas, requested, through a personal letter addressed to the Secretary-General of the United Nations, the extension of CICIG's mandate for an additional two years. The extension was confirmed on April 15, 2009, when Secretary-General Ban Ki-moon sent a personal response to the Minister of Foreign Relations, expressing the UN's desire to have CICIG continue its work supporting national institutions for another two years. In January, President Otto Pérez Molina announced that he would extend CICIG's mandate until the end of his term. The mandate was renewed again in April 2015.

In 2018, Guatemalan President Jimmy Morales announced that he would not renew the mandate of the International Commission against Impunity in Guatemala (CICIG), and ordered the immediate transfer of functions to the Public Ministry and the Ministry of the Interior. The mandate of the UN anti-corruption commission ends on September 3, 2019. In anticipation, President Morales deployed the armed forces near the headquarters of the International Commission against Impunity in Guatemala.

Guatemalan Foreign Minister Sandra Jovel said on 7 January 2019 that the UN body "had 24 hours to leave the country". However, on 9 January 2019, Guatemala's constitutional court suspended the decision "after eight hours of deliberation overnight"

Objectives
CICIG's mandate consists of three principal objectives:

First, CICIG shall investigate the existence of illicit security forces and clandestine organizations that commit crimes that affect the fundamental human rights of the citizens of Guatemala, and identify the illegal group structures (including links between state officials and organized crime), activities, modes of operation and sources of financing.
Second, CICIG's professional personnel shall support the work of Guatemalan institutions, principally the Attorney General in his/her work to investigate and prosecute the individuals involved in the illegal groups. Additionally, CICIG will make recommendations to the Government for the adoption of new public policies and procedures directed at the eradication of these groups and will strengthen the state's capacity to protect the basic human rights of its citizens.
Third, CICIG shall provide technical assistance to legal institutions in order to leave the Public Prosecutor's Office and National Civilian Police better equipped to fight organized crime after the conclusion of CICIG's mandate.

CICIG has the legal ability to support the Public Prosecutor's Office in criminal prosecutions, and participate as a complementary prosecutor (querellante adhesivo), in conformity with Guatemala's Code of Criminal Procedure. CICIG also has legal standing to make administrative complaints against public officials, in particular when the officials have committed acts intended to obstruct its mandate, and it can act as an interested third party in disciplinary procedures initiated against such officials.

In 2008, the General Assembly of the United Nations expressed in its resolution, “The situation in Central America: progress in fashioning a region of peace, freedom, democracy and development”, its appreciation to member states that supported the CICIG and urged them to continue their support. Moreover, the General Assembly expressed its appreciation to Secretary-General Ban Ki-moon for his continued assistance to the commission and request him “to continue to do so in order that the Commission may successfully carry out its mandate and address the challenges that it faces”.

Investigations

Campaign finance in Guatemala 

On July 16, 2015, the CICIG presented a report on the state of political finance in Guatemala, in which it argued that the current financing structure in Guatemalan politics was, by default, illegal. Legislation regarding campaign finance in Guatemala is lax at best, and the government does not require campaigns and organizations to disclose origins of financial donations nor does it prohibit the accepting of donations from entities linked to illegal practices. Thus, the report highlighted that most of Guatemala's political organizations would be involved in illegal campaign finance.

Criticism 

The commission has been subject to criticism for many years from many different entities. One notable critic has been the Partido Socialista Centroamericano (Central American Socialist Party), which accused the commission of being an agent of the United States and the European Union to guarantee the functionality of the “capitalist state” in Guatemala. The entity has been further accused of working to end corruption in Guatemala inasmuch as it allows for foreign interests to continue unimpeded. Other critiques have come from entities disgruntled at some of the earlier cases the commission took on, in which direct retribution against illegally acting agents was deemed insufficient.

See also
Guatemala Human Rights Commission
United Nations 
Rodrigo Rosenberg Marzano
La Línea corruption case
Otto Pérez Molina
Alfonso Portillo

References

External links
www.cicig.org
WOLA Report on the CICIG Experience

Law enforcement in Guatemala
Organizations established by the United Nations
Organizations established in 2006
2006 establishments in Guatemala
Guatemala and the United Nations
Impunity